Birsa Institute of Technology Sindri (BIT Sindri), formerly Bihar Institute of Technology Sindri, is an affiliated engineering college in Sindri, Jharkhand, India. Established in 1949, BIT Sindri is one of the oldest engineering and technological institute in India.

History
BIT Sindri was established in 1949 as College of Mechanical and Electrical Engineering, Sindri with temporary campus at Patna and affiliated to Patna University. It was shifted to its permanent campus at Sindri in Dhanbad District a year later, where it was renamed as Bihar Institute of Technology, Sindri.  After reorganisation of Patna University and establishment of Ranchi University in 1960, it was affiliated to Ranchi University. BIT Sindri was later affiliated to Vinoba Bhave University after establishment of Vinoba Bhave University at Hazaribagh in September 1992.  Currently, it is affiliated to Jharkhand University of Technology. With the partition of Bihar in 2000, BIT Sindri was named Birsa Institute of Technology, but later decided to be referred only as BIT Sindri because of historical importance of its name.

Academics
The institute continued to be affiliated with Vinoba Bhave University until 2017. From 2018 onwards, the institute has been affiliated with the Jharkhand University of Technology (JUT), Ranchi, the foundations of which were laid down by the former Hon'ble president of India, Shri Pranab Mukherjee. All courses are approved by the All India Council of Technical Education.
The institute currently conducts graduate and postgraduate courses in ten disciplines of engineering which are supported by three departments of natural sciences, one department each of earth sciences and humanities.

Engineering Disciplines:
 Mechanical Engineering
 Electrical Engineering
 Production Engineering
 Civil Engineering
 Metallurgical Engineering
 Computer Science and Engineering
 Electronics and Communication Engineering
 Information Technology
 Chemical Engineering
 Mining Engineering
Natural Sciences:
 Physics
 Chemistry
 Mathematics
Earth Sciences
Geology and Geoscience
Humanities

Currently, postgraduate students are admitted to the Department of Mechanical Engineering and Department of Electrical Engineering only.
Admission to undergraduate courses were earlier based on ranks in Jharkhand Engineering Entrance Competitive Exam(JEECE), conducted by Jharkhand Combined Entrance Competitive Examination(JCECE) Board. The JCECEB announced in April 2019 that admissions to the institute shall be based on scores in JEE-Main, a national level engineering entrance examination conducted by the National Testing Agency or NTA.

BIT Sindri is particularly known for its core engineering departments viz. Mechanical and Electrical Engineering and an appreciable number of students from these departments clear the coveted Indian Engineering Services exam, conducted by Union Public Service Commission.

Campus

The Institute campus spreads over an area of 450 acres of land, located near the eastern bank of Damodar River.
The campus is fully residential, both for faculty as well as the students.

Students are housed in a total of 27 Hostels for both Undergraduate and Post-Graduate Programs. Construction for newer hostels is underway too. Much of the work of the construction has been completed and the campus now has new infrastructure and new facilities.

Alumni
Notable alumni include:
 
 
Subodh Das - Material scientist, CEO of Phinix LLC, USA
Bidhu Jha - Member of the Legislative Assembly of Manitoba for Radisson
Subodha Kumar - Paul R. Anderson Distinguished Chair Professor, Fox School of Business, Temple University, USA
Inder Singh Namdhari - 1st Speaker of the Jharkhand Assembly and also a M.P from Chatra, Jharkhand
B. S. Sahay - Director of the Indian Institute of Management Jammu and former Director of the Indian Institute of Management Raipur

References

Colleges affiliated to Vinoba Bhave University
Engineering colleges in Jharkhand
Education in Dhanbad district
Memorials to Birsa Munda
Educational institutions established in 1949
1949 establishments in India